Social Epistemology: A Journal of Knowledge, Culture and Policy is a highly ranked, bimonthly peer-reviewed academic journal. It was established in 1987 and is published by Routledge in collaboration with the Society for Social Studies of Science and the European Association for the Study of Science and Technology. It provides a cutting-edge forum for philosophical and social scientific enquiry that incorporates the work of scholars from a variety of disciplines who share a concern with the production, assessment and validation of knowledge. The journal covers both empirical research into the origination and transmission of knowledge and normative considerations which arise as such research is implemented, serving as a guide for directing contemporary knowledge enterprises. It operates in tandem with the Social Epistemology Review and Reply Collective, an open-access forum for intellectual inquiry which publishes critical replies to journal articles, book reviews, and article reviews, and hosts debates exploring knowledge as a social phenomenon.

Editor-in-chief
The founding editor-in-chief was Steve Fuller (University of Warwick), who was succeeded in 1997 by Joan Leach (University of Queensland). From 2009-2018, the journal was edited by James H. Collier (Virginia Tech), who continues to serve as digital editor of the Social Epistemology Review and Reply Collective. Since 2018, Georg Theiner (Villanova University) is serving as editor-in-chief of the journal.

External links 
 
 European Association for the Study of Science and Technology
Social Epistemology Review and Reply Collective
Twitter
Social Epistemology Network Public Facebook Group
Society for Social Studies of Science

Taylor & Francis academic journals
Bimonthly journals
English-language journals
Publications established in 1987
Epistemology journals
Social philosophy literature
Social epistemology
Science and technology studies journals